Wingrove may refer to:

Places
Wingrove, Newcastle upon Tyne
Wingrove, West Virginia
Wingrove, Buckinghamshire

Other uses
Wingrove (surname)